Philip Edward Thomas (3 March 1878 – 9 April 1917) was a British writer of poetry and prose. He is sometimes considered a war poet, although few of his poems deal directly with his war experiences.  He only started writing poetry at the age of 36, but by that time he had already been a prolific critic, biographer, nature writer and travel writer for two decades. In 1915, he enlisted in the British Army to fight in the First World War and was killed in action during the Battle of Arras in 1917, soon after he arrived in France.

Life and career

Background and early life
Edward Thomas was the son of Mary Elizabeth Townsend and Philip Henry Thomas, a civil servant, author, preacher and local politician. He was born in Lambeth, an area of present-day south London, previously in Surrey. He was educated at Belleville School, Battersea Grammar School and St Paul's School, all in London.

Thomas's family were mostly Welsh. Of his six great-grandparents for whom information has been found, five were born in Wales, and one in Ilfracombe. All four of his grandparents had been born and brought up in Wales. Of these, his paternal grandparents lived in Tredegar. His grandmother, Rachel Phillips, had been born and brought up there, whilst his grandfather, Henry Thomas, who'd been born in Neath, worked there as a collier and then an engine fitter. Their son, Philip Henry, who was Edward Thomas's father, had been born in Tredegar and spent his early years there.

Thomas's maternal grandfather was Edward Thomas Townsend, the son of Margaret and Alderman William Townsend, a Newport merchant active in Liberal and Chartist politics. His maternal grandmother was Catherine Marendaz, from Margam, just outside  Port Talbot, where her family had been tenant farmers since at least the late 1790s. Their daughter, Mary Elizabeth Townsend, married Philip Henry Thomas. Mary and Philip were Edward Thomas's parents.

Although Edward Thomas's father, Philip Henry Thomas, had left Tredegar for Swindon (and then London) in his early teens, “the Welsh connection was … enduring.” He continued throughout his life to visit his relatives in south Wales. His feelings for Wales were also manifest in other ways. There were frequent journeys to Merthyr to lecture on behalf of the Ethical Society, and even a visit in 1906 to a National Eisteddfod in north Wales. Philip Henry Thomas “cultivated his Welsh connections assiduously,” so much so that Edward Thomas and his brothers could even boast that their father knew Lloyd George.

Like his father before him, Edward Thomas continued throughout his life to visit his many relatives and friends in Ammanford, Newport, Swansea and Pontardulais. Thomas also enjoyed a twenty-year  friendship with a distant cousin, the teacher, theologian and poet, John Jenkins (Gwili), of the Hendy, just across the county border from Pontardulais. Gwili’s elegy for Thomas describes the many walks they took together in the countryside around Pontardulais and Ammanford. Such was the family’s connection to this part of Wales that three of  Edward Thomas's brothers were sent to school at Watcyn Wyn’s Academy in Ammanford, where Gwili had become headmaster in 1908.

From Oxford to Adlestrop
Between 1898 and 1900, Thomas was a history scholar at Lincoln College, Oxford. In June 1899, he married Helen Berenice Noble (1877–1967) in Fulham, while still an undergraduate, and determined to live his life by the pen. He then worked as a book reviewer, reviewing up to 15 books every week. He was already a seasoned writer by the outbreak of war, having published widely as a literary critic and biographer as well as writing about the countryside. He also wrote a novel, The Happy-Go-Lucky Morgans (1913), a "book of delightful disorder".

Thomas worked as literary critic for the Daily Chronicle in London and became a close friend of Welsh tramp poet W. H. Davies, whose career he almost single-handedly developed. From 1905 until 1906, Thomas lived with his wife Helen and their two children at Elses Farm near Sevenoaks, Kent. He rented a tiny cottage nearby to Davies, and nurtured his writing as best he could. On one occasion, Thomas arranged for the manufacture, by a local wheelwright, of a makeshift wooden leg for Davies.

In 1906 the family moved to Steep, East Hampshire, on the outskirts of the market town of Petersfield - attracted by the landscape, its links with London, and schooling at the innovative co-educational private school Bedales. They lived in and around Steep in three separate homes for ten years until 1916 when they moved to Essex following Thomas's enlistment. Their third child, Myfanwy, was born in August 1910.

Even though Thomas thought that poetry was the highest form of literature and regularly reviewed it, he only became a poet himself at the end of 1914 when living at Steep, and initially published his poetry under the name Edward Eastaway. The American poet Robert Frost, who was living in England at the time, in particular encouraged Thomas (then more famous as a critic) to write poetry, and their friendship was so close that the two planned to reside side by side in the United States. Frost's most famous poem, "The Road Not Taken", was inspired by walks with Thomas and Thomas's indecisiveness about which route to take.

By August 1914, the village of Dymock in Gloucestershire had become the residence of a number of literary figures, including Lascelles Abercrombie, Wilfrid Gibson and Robert Frost. Edward Thomas was a visitor at this time.

Thomas immortalised the (now-abandoned) railway station at Adlestrop in a poem of that name after his train made a stop at the Cotswolds station on 24 June 1914, shortly before the outbreak of the First World War.

War service

Thomas enlisted in the Artists Rifles in July 1915, despite being a mature married man who could have avoided enlisting.  He was unintentionally influenced in this decision by his friend Frost, who had returned to the U.S. but sent Thomas an advance copy of "The Road Not Taken". The poem was intended by Frost as a gentle mocking of indecision, particularly the indecision that Thomas had shown on their many walks together; however, most took the poem more seriously than Frost intended, and Thomas similarly took it seriously and personally, and it provided the last straw in Thomas's decision to enlist.

Thomas was promoted to corporal, and in November 1916 was commissioned into the Royal Garrison Artillery as a second lieutenant. He was killed in action soon after he arrived in France at Arras on Easter Monday, 9 April 1917. To spare the feelings of his widow Helen, she was told the fiction of a "bloodless death" i.e. that Thomas was killed by the concussive blast wave of one of the last shells fired as he stood to light his pipe and that there was no mark on his body. However, a letter from his commanding officer Franklin Lushington written in 1936 (and discovered many years later in an American archive) states that in reality the cause of Thomas's death was being "shot clean through the chest". W. H. Davies was devastated by the death and his commemorative poem "Killed in Action (Edward Thomas)" was included in Davies's 1918 collection "Raptures".

Thomas is buried in the Commonwealth War Graves Cemetery at Agny in France (Row C, Grave 43).

Personal life
Thomas and his wife Helen had three children: a son, Merfyn, and daughters Bronwen and Myfanwy. After the war, Helen wrote about her courtship and early married life with Edward in the autobiography As it Was (1926); a second volume, World Without End was published in 1931. Myfanwy later said that the books had been written by her mother as a form of therapy to help lift herself from the deep depression into which she had fallen following Thomas's death.

Helen's short memoir A Memory of W. H. Davies was published in 1973, after her own death. In 1988, Helen's writings were gathered into a book published under the title Under Storm's Wing, which included As It Was and World Without End as well as a selection of other short works by Helen and her daughter Myfanwy and six letters sent by Robert Frost to her husband. Myfanwy Thomas, only six when her father died, produced her own memoir of Edward and Helen, One of These Fine Days, in 1982.

Commemorations
The Edward Thomas Fellowship was founded in 1980 and aims to perpetuate the memory of Edward Thomas and foster interest in his life and works.

Thomas is commemorated in Poets' Corner, Westminster Abbey, London, by memorial windows in the churches at Steep and at Eastbury in Berkshire, a blue plaque at 14 Lansdowne Gardens in Stockwell, south London, where he was born  and a London County Council plaque at 61 Shelgate Road SW11.

There is also a plaque dedicated to him at 113 Cowley Road, Oxford, where he lodged before entering Lincoln College, as well as featuring on the memorial board in the JCR of Lincoln College.

East Hampshire District Council have created a "literary walk" at Shoulder of Mutton Hill in Steep dedicated to Thomas, which includes a memorial stone erected in 1935. The inscription includes the final line from one of his essays: "And I rose up and knew I was tired and I continued my journey."

As "Philip Edward Thomas poet-soldier" he is commemorated, alongside "Reginald Townsend Thomas actor-soldier died 1918", who is buried at the spot, and other family members, at the North East Surrey (Old Battersea) Cemetery.

He is the subject of the biographical play The Dark Earth and the Light Sky by Nick Dear, which premiered at the Almeida Theatre, London in November 2012, with Pip Carter as Thomas and Hattie Morahan as his wife Helen.

In February 2013 his poem "Words" was chosen as the poem of the week by Carol Rumens in The Guardian.

A Study Centre dedicated to Edward Thomas, featuring more than 1,800 books by or about him collected by the late Tim Wilton-Steer, has been opened in Petersfield Museum. Access to the Study Centre is available by prior appointment.

Poetry

Thomas's poems are written in a colloquial style and frequently feature the English countryside. The short poem In Memoriam exemplifies how his poetry blends the themes of war and the countryside.

On 11 November 1985, Thomas was among 16 Great War poets commemorated on a slate stone unveiled in Westminster Abbey's Poet's Corner. The inscription, written by fellow poet Wilfred Owen, reads: "My subject is War, and the pity of War. The Poetry is in the pity."

Thomas was described by British Poet Laureate Ted Hughes as "the father of us all."

At least nineteen of his poems were set to music by the Gloucester composer Ivor Gurney.

A study centre dedicated to Thomas is located at Petersfield Museum in Hampshire.

Selected works

Poetry collections
 Six Poems (under pseudonym Edward Eastaway) Pear Tree Press, 1916.
 Poems, Holt, 1917, which included "The Sign-Post"
 Last Poems, Selwyn & Blount, 1918.
 Collected Poems, Selwyn & Blount, 1920.
 Two Poems, Ingpen & Grant, 1927.
 Selected Poems of Edward Thomas. With an Introduction by Edward Garnett, Gregynog Press, 1927. 275 copies
 The Poems of Edward Thomas, ed. R. George Thomas, Oxford University Press, 1978.
 Edward Thomas: Selected Poems and Prose, ed. David Wright, Penguin Books, 1981.
 Edward Thomas: A Mirror of England, ed. Elaine Wilson, Paul & Co., 1985.
 Edward Thomas: Selected Poems, ed. Ian Hamilton, Bloomsbury, 1995.
 The Poems of Edward Thomas, ed. Peter Sacks, Handsel Books, 2003.
 The Annotated Collected Poems, ed. Edna Longley, Bloodaxe Books, 2008.

Prose
 The Woodland Life, William Blackwood and Sons, 1897
 Horae Solitariae, Duckworth, 1902
 Oxford, A & C Black, 1903
 Beautiful Wales, Black, 1905
 The Heart of England, Dent , 1906
 Richard Jefferies: His Life and Work, Hutchinson, 1909
 The South Country, Dent, 1909 (republished by Tuttle, 1993), Little Toller Books (2009)
 Rest and Unrest, Duckworth, 1910
 Light and Twilight, Duckworth, 1911
 Lafcadio Hearn, Houghton Mifflin Company, 1912
 The Icknield Way, Constable, 1913
 Walter Pater: A Critical Study, Martin Secker, 1913
 The Happy-Go-Lucky Morgans, Duckworth, 1913.
 In Pursuit of Spring Thomas Nelson and Sons, 1914, Little Toller Books edition 2016
 Four and Twenty Blackbirds Duckworth, 1915. 
 A Literary Pilgrim in England, (UK: Methuen, US: Dodd, Mead and Company) 1917 (republished by Oxford University Press, 1980)
 The Last Sheaf, Jonathan Cape, 1928
 A Language Not to Be Betrayed, Carcanet, 1981
 Autobiographies, Oxford University Press, 2011. Volume 1 of Edward Thomas: Prose Writings: A Selected Edition.

Influence on other writers

 In 1918 W. H. Davies published his poem Killed in Action (Edward Thomas) to mark the personal loss of his close friend and mentor.
 Many poems about Thomas by other poets can be found in the books Elected Friends: Poems For and About Edward Thomas, (1997, Enitharmon Press) edited by Anne Harvey, and Branch-Lines: Edward Thomas and Contemporary Poetry, (2007, Enitharmon Press) edited by Guy Cuthbertson and Lucy Newlyn.
 Norman Douglas considered Thomas handicapped in life through lacking "a little touch of bestiality, a little je-m'en-fous-t-ism. He was too scrupulous".
 Eleanor Farjeon was a close friend of Thomas and after his death remained close to his wife. From her correspondence she constructed her 1958 memoir Edward Thomas: The Last Four Years.
 In his 1980 autobiography, Ways of Escape, Graham Greene references Thomas's poem "The Other" (about a man who seems to be following his own doppelgänger from hotel to hotel) in describing his own experience of being bedeviled by an imposter.
 Thomas's Collected Poems was one of Andrew Motion's ten picks for the poetry section of the "Guardian Essential Library" in October 2002.
 In his 2002 novel Youth, J. M. Coetzee has his main character, intrigued by the survival of pre-modernist forms in British poetry, ask himself: "What happened to the ambitions of poets here in Britain? Have they not digested the news that Edward Thomas and his world are gone for ever?" In contrast, Irish critic Edna Longley writes that Thomas's Lob, a 150-line poem, "strangely preempts The Waste Land through verses like: "This is tall Tom that bore / The logs in, and with Shakespeare in the hall / Once talked".
 In his 1995 novel, Borrowed Time, the author Robert Goddard bases the home of the main character at Greenhayes in the village of Steep, where Thomas lived from 1913. Goddard weaves some of the feeling from Thomas's poems into the mood of the story and also uses some quotes from Thomas's works.
 Will Self's 2006 novel, The Book of Dave, has a quote from The South Country as the book's epigraph: "I like to think how easily Nature will absorb London as she absorbed the mastodon, setting her spiders to spin the winding sheet and her worms to fill in the graves, and her grass to cover it pitifully up, adding flowers – as an unknown hand added them to the grave of Nero."
 The children's author Linda Newbery has published a novel, Lob (David Fickling Books, 2010, illustrated by Pam Smy) inspired by the Thomas poem of the same name and containing oblique references to other work by him.
 Woolly Wolstenholme, formerly of UK rock band Barclay James Harvest, has used a humorous variation of Thomas' poem "Adlestrop" on the first song of his 2004 live album, Fiddling Meanly, where he imagines himself in a retirement home and remembers "the name" of the location where the album was recorded. The poem was read at Wolstenholme's funeral on 19 January 2011.
 Stuart Maconie in his book Adventures on the High Teas mentions Thomas and "Adlestrop". Maconie visits the now abandoned and overgrown station which was closed by Beeching in 1966.
 Robert MacFarlane, in his 2012 book The Old Ways, critiques Thomas and his poetry in the context of his own explorations of paths and walking as an analogue of human consciousness.
 In his 2012 novel Sweet Tooth, Ian McEwan has a character invoke "Adlestrop," as a "sweet, old-fashioned thing" and an example of "the sense of pure existence, of being suspended in space and time, a time before a cataclysmic war".<ref>Ian McEwan, 2012, Sweet Tooth," Ian McEwan Nan A. Talese, 2012, pp 177-178</ref>
 The last years of Thomas's life are explored in A Conscious Englishman, a 2013 biographical novel by Margaret Keeping, published by StreetBooks.
In the 9 November 2018 issue of The Wall Street Journal, an opinion commentary by Aaron Schnoor honored the poetry of World War I, including Thomas' poem "Gone, Gone Again".
 Pat Barker's 1995 Booker Prize-winning novel of World War I, The Ghost Road, has as its opening epigraph four lines from Thomas's poem "Roads": "Now all roads lead to France/ And heavy is the tread/ Of the living; but the dead/ Returning lightly dance."
 Poet Laureate Andrew Motion has said that Thomas occupies "a crucial place in the development of twentieth-century poetry" for introducing a modern sensibility, later found in the work of such poets as W. H. Auden and Ted Hughes, to the poetic subjects of Victorian and Georgian poetry.

Sculpture

In December 2017 the National Museum of Wales at Cardiff displayed a sculptural installation by the Herefordshire artist Claire Malet depicting a holloway and incorporating a copy of Thomas's Collected Poems'', open at 'Roads':

Crowding the solitude
Of the loops over the downs,
Hushing the roar of towns
And their brief multitude.

References

Additional sources

Bibliography

External links

 .
 .
 
 
 
 .
 .
 .
 Edward Thomas Archive at Cardiff University
 
 
 
 Edward Thomas Study Centre at Petersfield Museum
Edward and Helen Thomas manuscripts at the National Library of Wales
The digitised war diary of Edward Thomas at the National Library of Wales

1878 births
1917 deaths
Alumni of Lincoln College, Oxford
Anglo-Welsh poets
Artists' Rifles soldiers
British Army personnel of World War I
British military personnel killed in World War I
British World War I poets
20th-century English male writers
20th-century English poets
People from Lambeth
Royal Garrison Artillery officers
People educated at Battersea Grammar School
People educated at St Paul's School, London
English male poets
Deaths by firearm in France
People from Steep, Hampshire
Lost Generation writers
Military personnel from Surrey